You Are the Only One or You're the Only One may refer to:

TV
 You Are the Only One (TV series), 2014-2015 South Korean television series

Music

Albums
 You're the Only One (album), a 1990 album by  Faye Wong

Songs
 "You're the Only One" (Dolly Parton song), 1979 single release
 "You Are the Only One" (Emily Osment song), 2010
 "You Are the Only One" (Sergey Lazarev song), Russia's entry to Eurovision Song Contest 2016
 "You Are the Only One", by Ivan Mikulić, Croatian entry in the Eurovision Song Contest 2004
 "You Are the Only One", song by Candy O'Terry and Charlie Farren
 "You Are the Only One", song by Kirk Franklin and God's Property from God's Property from Kirk Franklin's Nu Nation
 "You Are the Only One", 1960 single by Ricky Nelson
 "You're the Only One", chart single by Val Doonican 1968
 "You're the Only One", song by Eric Benet from Love & Life
 "You're the Only One", song by Maria Mena from Mellow